RCAN2 is a gene that in humans encodes for the protein Calcipressin-2.

Calcipressin-2 is a protein that in humans is encoded by the RCAN2 gene.

Summary box
N/A

See also
 RCAN1 
 RCAN3

References

Further reading

External links